Pelagicola litorisediminis is a Gram-negative, aerobic and non-motile bacterium from the genus of Pelagicola which has been isolated from tidal flat sediments from the South Sea in Korea.

References 

Rhodobacteraceae
Bacteria described in 2013